Peeter Jakobi (15 October 1940 — 21 September 2014) was an Estonian actor.

Jakobi was born in Tallinn. In 1968 he graduated from the Tallinn State Conservatory's Performing Arts Department. From 1973 until 2008, he was an actor at the Rakvere Theatre. Besides theatre roles he has played also in several films.

From 1966 until 1973, he was married to actress Katrin Karisma. The couple have a son, Ivo.

Awards
 2006: Kultuuripärl (given by Cultural Endowment of Estonia)

Selected filmography

 1969: Viimne reliikvia (feature film; in the role: Ivo Schenkenberg)
 1971: Metskapten
 1997: Minu Leninid 	
 2005: Libahundi needus
 2005: Stiilipidu
 2006: Vana daami visiit
 2013: Elavad pildid
 2017: Mehetapja/Süütu/Vari

References

Living people
1940 births
Estonian male stage actors
Estonian male film actors
Estonian male television actors
20th-century Estonian male actors
21st-century Estonian male actors
Estonian Academy of Music and Theatre alumni
Male actors from Tallinn